James Oram (born 17 June 1993) is a New Zealand cyclist, who currently rides for UCI ProTeam .

Major results

2010
 4th Overall Tour de l'Abitibi
2011
 1st Overall Tour de l'Abitibi
1st Stage 1
 1st Overall BDO Tour of Northland
1st Stage 1
 2nd  Time trial, UCI Junior Road World Championships
2012
 10th Chrono Champenois
2013
 National Road Championships
1st  Under-23 road race
2nd Under-23 time trial
3rd Road race
 1st  Overall Tour of Southland
1st Stage 2
 5th Chrono Champenois
2014
 1st Stage 1 San Dimas Stage Race
 National Under-23 Road Championships
2nd Time trial
3rd Road race
 2nd Overall New Zealand Cycle Classic
1st Stage 5
 10th Time trial, UCI Road World Under-23 Championships
 10th Overall Tour of Alberta
2015
 1st  Time trial, National Under-23 Road Championships
 2nd The REV Classic
 3rd Overall Volta ao Alentejo
1st  Young rider classification
1st Stage 1
 4th Overall GP Liberty Seguros
 6th Time trial, UCI Road World Under-23 Championships
 7th Overall Tour de Beauce
 8th Overall New Zealand Cycle Classic
1st Stage 3
2016
 4th Overall New Zealand Cycle Classic
 6th Beaumont Trophy
2017
 3rd Overall New Zealand Cycle Classic
1st  Mountains classification
 4th Overall Ronde van Midden-Nederland
1st Stage 1 (TTT)
 5th Overall Kreiz Breizh Elites
1st Stage 2
 6th Velothon Wales
 8th Overall Szlakiem Grodów Piastowskich
2018
 5th Time trial, Commonwealth Games
 5th Gravel and Tar
 6th Overall New Zealand Cycle Classic
 7th Overall Tour of Małopolska
 9th Overall Kreiz Breizh Elites
2019
 1st  Mountains classification, Tour de Korea
 4th Gravel and Tar
 9th Overall New Zealand Cycle Classic
 9th Overall Tour of Quanzhou Bay
 10th Overall Tour of Taiyuan
2020
 7th Overall New Zealand Cycle Classic
 10th Overall Herald Sun Tour
2021
 6th Overall New Zealand Cycle Classic
2022
 6th Overall Tour de la Mirabelle
2023
 1st  Road race, National Road Championships
 1st  Overall New Zealand Cycle Classic
1st Stage 1

References

External links
 
 
 
 
 
 

1993 births
Living people
New Zealand male cyclists
Cyclists at the 2018 Commonwealth Games
Commonwealth Games competitors for New Zealand
Sportspeople from Palmerston North